Karey Kirkpatrick (born 14 December 1964) is an American screenwriter, film director, and producer. His films include  Chicken Run, The Rescuers Down Under, James and the Giant Peach, Over the Hedge, The Spiderwick Chronicles, Charlotte's Web, and The Hitchhiker's Guide to the Galaxy. He has also directed the films Over the Hedge, Imagine That starring Eddie Murphy as well as Smallfoot. Kirkpatrick wrote the English-language screenplays for the U.S. releases of the Studio Ghibli films The Secret World of Arrietty in 2012 and From Up on Poppy Hill in 2013.

His older brother is American songwriter and musician Wayne Kirkpatrick, with whom he wrote the 2015 musical Something Rotten! as well as the 2020 musical  Mrs. Doubtfire.

Life and career
Kirkpatrick began his career as a staff writer at Walt Disney Feature Animation, where he worked for more than three years. During that time, he earned his first screenwriting credit as a co-writer on The Rescuers Down Under. He went to become a freelance screenwriter, and his early writing credits include Honey, We Shrunk Ourselves, James and the Giant Peach, and The Little Vampire. In 1997, Kirkpatrick wrote the screenplay for Aardman's Chicken Run from a story by Peter Lord and Nick Park. Kirkpatrick also wrote the screenplay adaptation of The Hitchhiker's Guide to the Galaxy for Touchstone Pictures and Spyglass Entertainment.

Kirkpatrick had a longstanding relationship with DreamWorks Animation, where he has contributed as a writer or story consultant on The Road to El Dorado and Madagascar. In May 2006, DreamWorks Animation released Over the Hedge, for which Kirkpatrick co-wrote the screenplay and made his directorial debut, sharing directing credits with Tim Johnson. That same year, Kirkpatrick co-wrote the screenplay of the live-action adaptation of E.B. White's classic Charlotte's Web for Paramount Pictures/Walden Media/Nickelodeon Movies. He produced and co-wrote, with partner Chris Poche, the comedy Flakes. He directed the Eddie Murphy dramedy Imagine That for Paramount Pictures.

Kirkpatrick wrote the English-language screenplay for the U.S. releases of the Japanese animated films The Secret World of Arrietty in 2012 and From Up on Poppy Hill in 2013, both of which were produced by Studio Ghibli. The same year, he contributed to the screenplay for Sony Pictures Animation's The Smurfs 2, and was announced as the writer and director of an original comedy film from DreamWorks Animation about a "dim-witted blue-footed booby"

In 2011, Karey and his brother Wayne began working on the musical Something Rotten!.  In 2015, they were nominated for a Tony Award for Best Original Score (Music and/or Lyrics) Written for the Theatre. Karey was also nominated for Best Book of a Musical along with John O'Farrell. They also received a Grammy nomination for "Best Original Cast Recording."

Kirkpatrick wrote and directed the animated musical comedy Smallfoot (2018), which was produced by the Warner Animation Group and animated by Sony Pictures Imageworks. Kirkpatrick, along with brother Wayne, also co-wrote the film's six original songs. 

Kirkpatrick also co-wrote the song "Such A Beautiful Day" for the Disney animated film "Phineas and Ferb: Candace Against The Universe" for which he received and Emmy Nomination for "Outstanding Original Song for a Preschool, Children's, or Animated Program"

Kirkpatrick and his Chicken Run co-writer John O'Farrell in 2018 were hired to script a sequel film, Chicken Run: Dawn of the Nugget. The film will be released on Netflix in December of 2023.

Filmography

Film

Television

Other credits

References

External links

Living people
American male screenwriters
DreamWorks Animation people
Aardman Animations people
Annie Award winners
Walt Disney Animation Studios people
American animated film directors
Animation screenwriters
Film directors from Louisiana
Broadway composers and lyricists
Year of birth missing (living people)